Dutse is the capital city of Jigawa State in northern Nigeria. It is home to Federal University, Dutse established in November 2011. In addition to the Federal University Dutse, there is also a Research Institute for Date Palm (Sub-Station) and state polytechnic in Dutse. The Jigawa State Polytechnic has its College of Business and Management Studies at Dutse.

Geography and landscape 
With an estimated population of 153,000 (2009), Dutse is currently the largest city in Jigawa State followed by Hadejia (111,000), Gumel (43,000), and Birnin Kudu (27,000).
Dutse is the capital of Jigawa state of Nigeria. The state was created in 1991 during the military regime of General Ibrahim Badamasi Babangida. Dutse (Dutsi, in earlier notes) got its name from the rocky topography peculiar to the area. Different forms of rocks can be seen widely spread across the town. Mostly igneous in nature, the rocky town got its name from this naturally endowed resources, Dutse (Hausa term for rock). Dutse and its environ are well known for Date Trees (Dabino) of different variety. The area is characterised with undulating topography and hilly walls. The name Jigawa (from Jigayi) is attributed to such topology. Peculiar to the North-Western states, the population of Dutse are predominantly Hausa and Fulani. With availability of agrarian land, the inhabitants of Dutse are predominantly farmers; other occupations typical to rural area are also available among the populace.

State creation
The agitation for the creation of Jigawa state was chaired by Malam Inuwa-Dutse, former commissioner of Agriculture and Natural Resources in the old Kano State (comprising present Kano and Jigawa states) during late Alhaji Audu Bako governorship. It started in the late-1970s but it was curtailed as result of military coup. There was renewed interest at different times since the first call. When the call for states creation resurfaced in the late-1980s, Jigawa people were not hesitant to lend their voices. The victorious moment came in the early-1990s (August, 1991, precisely) during the military regime of President Ibrahim Badamasi Babangida. Although the call for state creation was won, majority of the constituting local governments submitted in the original report for the creation of the state were phased out and new ones were introduced. Some of the areas left out include Albasu, Ajingi, Wudil, Sumaila, Kachako and Takai. Only few among those that agitated for such state creation were actually in the New World (Jigawa state, Tarin Allah as a common slogan for the state).

References

External links
 Federal University Dutse official website

Local Government Areas in Jigawa State
State capitals in Nigeria